Paul Sérusier (9 November 1864 – 7 October 1927) was a French painter who was a pioneer of abstract art and an inspiration for the avant-garde Nabis movement, Synthetism and Cloisonnism.

Education 
Sérusier was born in Paris. He studied at the Académie Julian and was a monitor there in the mid-1880s. In the summer of 1888 he travelled to Pont-Aven and joined the small group of artists centered there around Paul Gauguin.  While at the Pont-Aven artist's colony he painted a picture that became known as The Talisman, under the close supervision of Gauguin. The picture was an extreme exercise in Cloisonnism that approximated to pure abstraction. He was a Post-Impressionist painter, a part of the group of painters called Les Nabis. Sérusier, along with Paul Gauguin, named the group. Pierre Bonnard, Édouard Vuillard and Maurice Denis became the best known of the group, but at the time they were somewhat peripheral to the core group.

In 1892 Sérusier met and befriended Charles Hodge Mackie while the Scottish artist and his wife were honeymooning in France.  This friendship led to him contributing the illustration Pastorale Bretonne to The Evergreen: A Northern Seasonal: The Book of Spring published by Patrick Geddes and Colleagues in Edinburgh in 1895.

He later taught at the Académie Ranson and published his book ABC de la peinture in 1921. He died at Morlaix in Brittany.

Writings 
 ABC de la peinture, La Douce France & Henri Floury, Paris 1921
 - Second edition, accompanied by a study on Sérusier's life and work, by Maurice Denis, Librairie Floury, Paris 1942
 - Third edition, accompanied by an unpublished correspondence, collected by Madame P. Sérusier and annotated by Mademoiselle H. Boutaric, Librairie Floury, Paris 1950

Gallery of Paintings

References and sources
References

Sources
 Gauguin and the Nabis: Prophets of Modernism by Arthur Ellridge. Terrail, 1995.
 The Nabis: Bonnard, Vuillard and Their Circle by Claire Freches-Thory (Author), Antoine Terrasse (Author). Flammarion, 2003.
 The Nabis and the Parisian Avant-Garde by Patricia Eckert Boyer (Editor), Jane Voorhees Zimmerli Art Museum, Elizabeth Prelinger. Rutgers University Press, 1988.
 The Nabis and Their Period by Charles Chassé. Lund Humphries, 1969.
 The Nabis, Their History and Their Art, 1888–1896 by George Mauner. Garland Publishing, 1978.
 Frèches-Thory, Claire, & Perucchi-Petry, Ursula, ed.: Die Nabis: Propheten der Moderne, Kunsthaus Zürich & Grand Palais, Paris & Prestel, Munich 1993   (German), (French)

External links 

 Sérusier at Olga's Gallery
 biography
Pierre Bonnard, the Graphic Art, an exhibition catalog from The Metropolitan Museum of Art (fully available online as PDF), which contains material on Sérusier (see index)

19th-century French painters
French male painters
20th-century French painters
20th-century French male artists
Post-impressionist painters
Académie Julian alumni
1864 births
1927 deaths
Lycée Condorcet alumni
Les Nabis
Pont-Aven painters
19th-century French male artists